Lunalva Torres de Almeida (born 14 July 1965), commonly known as Nalvinha, is a Brazilian footballer who played as a midfielder for the Brazil women's national football team. She was part of the team at the 1991 FIFA Women's World Cup and 1995 FIFA Women's World Cup.

At club level she spent much of her career with Saad Esporte Clube, a successful Brazilian women's club of the era. She also represented Grêmio.

References

External links
 

1965 births
Living people
Brazilian women's footballers
Brazil women's international footballers
Place of birth missing (living people)
1995 FIFA Women's World Cup players
Women's association football forwards
1991 FIFA Women's World Cup players
Saad Esporte Clube (women) players
Grêmio Foot-Ball Porto Alegrense (women) players